A rocker turn is a kind of one-foot turn in figure skating.  Unlike three turns and brackets, where the entry and exit edges follow the same curve, in a rocker, the entry and exit are on opposite curves.  When executing a rocker, the skater turns inward on the curve of the entry edge, but exits on a curve in the opposite sense.  Another way to look at it is that a rocker is similar to the entry of a three turn combined with the exit of a bracket.  (The opposite combination is called a counter turn.)  In a rocker turn, the skating edge is maintained; for example, a rocker from a forward outside edge ends on a backward outside edge.

While rockers are sometimes used to perform a simple change of direction, they more commonly appear in step sequences and in compulsory dances in ice dancing.  For example, in the Westminster Waltz, the lady performs a rocker while the man performs a counter turn.

Figure skating elements